Ileanda is a commune located in Sălaj County, Transylvania, Romania. It is composed of thirteen villages: Bizușa-Băi (Büdöspataka), Bârsăuța (Kisborszó), Dăbiceni (Kisdoboka), Dolheni (Ilondapatak), Ileanda, Luminișu (Szakadás), Măleni (Kisilonda), Negreni (Konkolyfalva), Perii Vadului (Révkörtvélyes), Podișu (Csömény), Răstoci (Hosszúrév), Rogna  (Kornislaka) and Șasa (Sasfalu).

History

Human settlement began in Dacian times.

In the 1830s, Jews began to arrive in Ileanda, and by the end of the century, the community ran nearly all commerce and small industry in the village and its surroundings. In the interwar period, there was a yeshiva with 30 to 40 students, while Zionist activity started in the 1920s. In 1930, there were 308 Jews or 26% of the population. In June 1942, 11 Jews were drafted into labor battalions in Reichskommissariat Ukraine, of whom two survived. In May 1944, 900 Jews were sent by the authorities of the Kingdom of Hungary to the Dej ghetto and then to the Auschwitz concentration camp. József Paneth, who became the local rabbi in 1926, escaped deportation to Romania with his family. Following World War II, he served the surviving Jews until the community dispersed in 1950.

Sights 
 Wooden Church in Ileanda, built in the 17th century, historic monument
 Wooden Church in Negreni, built in the 17th century, historic monument
 Wooden Church in Răstoci, built in the 19th century (1828), historic monument 
 Wooden Church in Podișu, built in the 18th century, historic monument
 Forest “La Castani”, Natural reserve 
 Măgurici Cave, Natural reserve

References

External links
 Official site

Image gallery 

Communes in Sălaj County
Localities in Transylvania